The Romano R.120 was a twin-engine 4-seat bomber aircraft designed by Etienne Romano in the 1930s.

Specifications

References

External links

1930s French bomber aircraft
R.1w0
Twin piston-engined tractor aircraft